Claude Brugerolles (15 August 1931 – 21 November 1978) was a French cyclist. He competed in the 4,000 metres team pursuit event at the 1952 Summer Olympics.

References

External links
 

1931 births
1978 deaths
French male cyclists
Olympic cyclists of France
Cyclists at the 1952 Summer Olympics
People from Champigny-sur-Marne
French track cyclists
Sportspeople from Val-de-Marne
Cyclists from Île-de-France